Judah ben Nissim al-Malkah was a Moroccan, Jewish writer and philosopher living in the 13th century. His main work is Uns al-Gharīb (The Consolation of the Exiled). He also wrote a commentary on the Pirke De-Rabbi Eliezer and Tafsīr al-Salawāt, a commentary on liturgy and a work on astrology, which probably bore the title Kitāb al-Miftāh (The Key Book).

References

S. Munk, Les Manuscrits Hébreux de l'Oratoire (1911), pp. 15–17
Steinschneider, Uebersetzungen, pp. 405–6
J.M. Toledano, Ner ha-Ma'arav (1911), 41; 
G. Sarton, Introduction to the History of Science, 3 pt. 2 (1947), 1444
G. Vajda, "Juda ben Nissim Ibn Malka, philosophe juif marocain", in: Homenaje a Millas-Vallicrosa, 2 (1956)
M. Idel, in: Pe'amim, 43 (1990), pp. 4–15.
Juda Ibn Malka, La consolation de l'expatrié, traduit de l'hébreu et présenté par Paul Fenton, précédé par Georges Vajda, Les commentaires du Sefer yesîrâh. Editions de l'éclat, 2008

Moroccan writers
Moroccan philosophers
Jewish writers
Jewish philosophers
Kabbalists
13th-century Jews
13th-century Moroccan people
Medieval Moroccan Jews